Aizelles is a commune in the department of Aisne in the Hauts-de-France region of northern France.

Geography
Aizelles is some 20 km southeast of Laon and 30 km northwest of Reims.  There are only three access roads to the commune: the D889 running north from Corbeny to the town of Aizelles, the D89 running east from the D1044 from the western side of the commune, and the D88 which enters from the northeast of the commune. All three roads intersect in the village of Aizelles.

The commune is mostly farmland; however, there is a large forest, the Bois de Berrieux, to the east of the town. This forest occupies about a quarter of the land area of the commune.

The Ruisseau de Fayau runs through the village and the commune from northwest and is joined by the Ru du Moulin river before flowing to the Miette river southeast of the commune which in turn flows to the river Aisne to the south.

Neighbouring communes and towns

Administration

List of Mayors of Aizelles

Population

Sights

 Church of Saint Quentin
 Space Galerie D'Art-Expo hosts regular exhibitions during the summer.

Notable people linked to the commune
Philippe Malpezzi
Mhaize, sculptor and ceramist

See also
 Communes of the Aisne department

References

External links
Aizelles on the old IGN website 
Chemin des Dames Community of communes website 
4000 Clocks 
Aizelles on Géoportail, National Geographic Institute (IGN) website 
Aizelle on the 1750 Cassini Map

Communes of Aisne